Embalam is a panchayat village in Nettapakkam Commune in the Union Territory of Puducherry, India.

Geography
Embalam is bordered by Nallathur village (Tamil nadu) in the west, Sathamangalam in the north,  Sembiapalayam in the east and Manaveli village (Tamil nadu) in the south and south-west.

Transport
Embalam is located at 18 km. from  Pondicherry. Embalam can be reached directly by any bus running between Pondicherry and Maducarai via.  Embalam.

Road Network
Embalam is connected to Pondicherry by  Thavalakuppam-Embalam (RC-20) State Highway. Also Mangalam-Maducarai State Highway (RC-19) passes through Embalam

Politics
Embalam is a part of Embalam (Union Territory Assembly constituency) which comes under Puducherry (Lok Sabha constituency)

Gallery

References

External links
 Official website of the Government of the Union Territory of Puducherry

Villages in Puducherry district